Paul Stanford "Buddy" Dear (December 1, 1905 – August 29, 1989) was a Major League Baseball player who played in two games for the Washington Senators in . He was used as a pinch runner and second baseman. He was a star two-sport athlete at Virginia Tech in the mid-1920s. During his junior year in 1926 he came close to hitting .400 before breaking his leg in a late season game. As a senior, he led the Hokie baseball team to a perfect 8–0 record against other Virginia collegiate teams and an overall mark of 11–4. He was in the third class elected to the Virginia Tech Sports Hall of Fame in 1984. He was a native of Norfolk, VA.

References

External links

1905 births
1989 deaths
Washington Senators (1901–1960) players
Baseball players from Norfolk, Virginia